Beyond the Lights is the original soundtrack to the 2014 film, Beyond the Lights. It was released on November 10, 2014, through Relativity Music Group and consists of contemporary R&B and soul. The soundtrack includes songs performed by the film's fictional characters Noni (Gugu Mbatha-Raw) and Kid Culprit (Machine Gun Kelly), in addition to the Academy Award-nominated song, "Grateful", performed by Rita Ora and written by Diane Warren. The song subsequently also received a nomination at the 2015 Black Reel Awards.

Track listing
"Blackbird" - India Jean-Jacques - 1:36
"Masterpiece" - Kid Culprit / Noni - 2:57
"Extraordinary Love [Fall Version]" - Stacy Barthe - 4:40     
"Lights and Camera" - Yuna - 3:33     
"Give It All To Me" - Mavado featuring Nicki Minaj - 3:34     
"C'mon Boy" - Kid Culprit / Noni - 3:00
"Fly Before You Fall" - Cynthia Erivo - 3:04
"Just Girly Things" - Dawin - 3:57     
"Private Property" - Kid Culprit / Noni - 4:11
"Shelter" - Birdy - 3:43     
"Worthy" - Jacob Banks - 3:18
"Blackbird" - Noni - 3:54
"Grateful" - Rita Ora - 4:05

Credits

 The-Dream - Composer
 Diane Warren — Composer

Miscellaneaneous
The tracks "Drunk in Love" performed by Beyoncé & Jay-Z, "I Am Light" by India.Arie and "Don't Let Me Down" by Amel Larrieux, which feature prominently in the movie, do not appear on the soundtrack. Additionally, the track "Grateful" has been covered by the a cappella gospel choir Impact Repertory Choir of Harlem. A music video for "Masterpiece" performed by Kid Culprit (Machine Gun Kelly) and Noni (Gugu Mbatha-Raw) was also released.

Charts

Album

Single

References

2014 soundtrack albums
Mark Isham soundtracks
Drama film soundtracks